Shcheglov (from щегол meaning goldfinch) is a Russian masculine surname, its feminine counterpart is Shcheglova. It may refer to:

Ivan Shcheglov (1855–1911), Russian writer
Elena Shcheglova (born 1950), Russian figure skater
Lev Shcheglov (1946–2020), Russian sexologist
Nikolai Shcheglov (born 1960), Russian politician
Sergei Shcheglov (born 1976), Ukrainian football player

See also
2377 Shcheglov, a main-belt asteroid

Russian-language surnames